PAS-1 was a communications satellite owned by PanAmSat located at 45° West longitude, serving the Americas market. PAS-1 was also the first, privately owned, international telecommunication satellite. It was originally built for Contel ASC as ASC 3, but purchased before launch. It was primarily used for the main television channel of Panama. It was the first satellite to be able to service to five different American countries.

References 

Communications satellites in geostationary orbit
Satellite television
Spacecraft launched in 1988